Survivor is a British competition television series based on the international reality franchise of the same name. The series aired for two series on ITV network in 2001 and 2002, before being revived in 2023 by BBC. Following the premise of other versions of the format, the show features a group of contestants become castaways as they are marooned in an isolated location, where they must provide food, water, fire, and shelter for themselves. The contestants compete in challenges for rewards and immunity from elimination. The contestants are progressively eliminated from the game as they are voted off the island by their fellow castaways. The final castaway remaining is awarded the title of "Ultimate Survivor" and a monetary prize.

While it was considered a failure in the ratings by ITV, the programme was watched by more viewers than other reality series at the time, including Big Brother. ITV cancelled Survivor after two series after it had failed to garner a loyal viewership. The network admitted fault for not supporting the series enough in its launch phase, highlighting the key issue with their approach to be the scheduling of the series. Since 2017, reports that the series would be revived had circulated in the media, with BBC One confirming this in 2022.

Format

The show follows the same general format as the other editions of Survivor. To begin, the players are split into two or three tribes, are taken to a remote isolated location and are forced to live off the land with meagre supplies for a period of several weeks. Frequent physical and mental challenges are used to pit the tribes against each other for rewards, such as food or luxuries, or for immunity, forcing the other tribe to attend Tribal Council, where they must vote one of their tribemates out of the game by secret ballot.

About halfway through the game, the tribes are merged into a single tribe, and challenges are on an individual basis; winning immunity prevents that player from being voted out. Most players that are voted out during this stage become members of the Tribal Council Jury. When only two or three players remain, the Final Tribal Council is held. The finalists plead their case to the Jury as to why they should win the game. The jurors then have the opportunity to interrogate the finalists before casting their vote for which finalist should be considered the "Ultimate Survivor" and be awarded the grand prize. The prize on the 2001–2002 ITV iteration was £1,000,000 and is £100,000 on the 2023 BBC iteration.

History

Original run
The first series, Survivor: Pulau Tiga, premiered on ITV on 21 May 2001. Billboards were allotted around the UK displaying the slogan "You Don't Win, You Survive". The billboards created confusion amongst viewers as it misled them into thinking people would die throughout the game. Executive producer Nigel Lythgoe complained to Heat magazine about the decision. He said: "The tagline when I left for Borneo was 'Trust No One', which is great. When I got back it was, 'You Don't Win, You Survive'. Well, you did win – you won a million pounds! And of course you survive, because we're not going to let you die." Despite Survivor receiving initial media hype, the debut episode opened with 6.6 million viewers, which was seen as a disappointment for ITV. Despite the figures, an ITV spokesperson said: "We couldn't have hoped for anything better. We never expected 10m on the first night although we hope it will build to this. You have got to remember that we introduced 16 strangers and a complicated gameshow to the audience and we are confident it will grow. It's already a massive talking point, making the front pages." Ratings for the series then dropped to an average of 5 million, which was half of the audience that the network had expected. In response, ITV made the decision to transmit less episodes per week to allow the hype for the series to grow. However, their change failed to have an impact on viewing figures. Nevertheless, the finale of the first series garnered 7.7 million viewers, peaking at 9 million.

Despite being low in ratings by ITV's expectations, Survivor was the most watched reality television series in the UK at its time of airing, such as Big Brother. After the first series had concluded, Julia Lamaison, ITV's Head of Strategy, admitted that the network were too hopeful with their expectations for the series. They had hoped for a series average of 12 million viewers, accrediting their hopefulness to the success of the series in America. Lamaison also admitted that ITV had not supported Survivor enough in the first series, particularly with the time slot and the scheduling. Despite the low ratings for the first series, ITV aired the second series, Survivor: Panama, a year after the first. Survivor faced an overhaul, the changes of which included fewer contestants, audience participation and replacing presenters Mark Austin and John Leslie with one sole presenter, Mark Nicholas. It was aired every Wednesday at 9:45pm and episodes were repeated on Fridays at 8:30pm. The second series was also accompanied by Survivor: The Last Word, a televised interview with evictees, as well as a supporting series, Survivor: Raw, broadcast on sister channel ITV2. After Survivors viewership failed to increase, ITV cancelled it after two series.

I'm a Celebrity ... lawsuit
After Survivor was axed by ITV, the network began broadcasting I'm a Celebrity...Get Me Out of Here!, the format of which had many similarities to Survivor, and which received massive ratings in August 2002. The show's similarity in content to Survivor led many viewers to believe that the shows had some licensing agreement, however this was not the case. Legal action was sought by CBS to prevent broadcast in the US, however the court ruled against, stating that "Celebrity is different enough from Survivor that CBS would have difficulty prevailing in its underlying copyright infringement suit."

2023 revival
Following the Banijay Group's acquisition of Castaway Productions, who own the Survivor format, it was said in 2017 that the company were looking to revive Survivor in the UK. Banijay's CEO Peter Langenberg spoke to Broadcast about the potential return, stating that RDF, the largest UK production company within Banijay, is attempting to rekindle interest in the format amongst broadcasters. He explained: "Having hands on the format means we can polish it and come up with Survivor 2.0, because it needs a refresh".

Reports began circulating again in 2022 that the series would be revived, this time with BBC One said to be the potential new home of the series. Broadcast reported that the revival deal for Survivor is "on the brink", and that if the deal is finalised, the third series of the programme will be filmed in 2023 with thirteen episodes. Digital Spy's Daniel Kilkelly put forward his hopes for a revival of the programme. He felt that the key reasons for the series' initial failure lay with having a pre-recorded format which meant that viewers had no say into the events of the series. However, Kilkelly opined that the success of The Apprentice and The Great British Bake Off, both of which use pre-recorded formats, suggested that the British audience would now be ready to support a Survivor format. In September 2022, it was confirmed that Remarkable Entertainment (a subsidiary of Banijay) would produce a new series and would air on BBC One in 2023 consisting of 16 episodes. Contestant applications opened on 24 November. With the announcement of the application process, the prize of £100,000 was revealed. On 17 February 2023, Joel Dommett was confirmed as host of the revival.

Series details

Notes

References

External links
 
 
 

2001 British television series debuts
2000s British reality television series

British television series based on non-British television series
British television series revived after cancellation
English-language television shows
BBC reality television shows
ITV reality television shows
United Kingdom
Television series by ITV Studios
Television series by Banijay
Television series produced at Pinewood Studios